Medrado may refer to:

People
 Deborah Medrado (born 2002), Brazil rhythmic gymnast
 Patricia Medrado (born 1956), Brazilian tennis player

Places
 Elísio Medrado, municipality in the North-East of Brazil